The Doldertal Apartment Houses are a group of modern apartment buildings in Doldertal, a suburb of Zurich on the slope of the Adlisberg mountain. The buildings were designed by architects Alfred Roth, Emil Roth, and reviewed by Marcel Breuer. They were built in 1936.

The complex has a steel-frame infrastructure and a projecting walls of glass windows. It has been described as a "tensile box notable for its tightness and control.

The architectural model for the apartment complex is held in the permanent collection of the Museum of Modern Art in New York City.

Gallery

References

Further reading
Acerboni, Francesca; Postiglione, Gennaro; Gössel, Peter; 100: One Hundred Houses for One Hundred European Architects of the Twentieth Century, 2004, Taschen Publishers, pages 140–345. ISBN 9783822863121.

Culture of Zürich
Cultural property of national significance in the canton of Zürich
1930s architecture